The Bosphorus Cup (earlier: Istanbul Cup) is a figure skating competition held in December in Istanbul, Turkey. The competition includes men's singles, ladies singles, and ice dancing on the senior and junior levels.

Senior medalists

Men

Women

Ice dance

Junior medalists

Junior men

Junior women

Junior ice dance

Novice medalist

Men

Women

Ice dance

References 

Figure skating competitions
International figure skating competitions hosted by Turkey